The following is a list of films produced in the Kannada film industry in India in 2004, presented in alphabetical order.

Released films

January–June

July – December

References

External links
 Kannada Movies of 2004 at the Internet Movie Database

2004
Lists of 2004 films by country or language
 Kannada
2004 in Indian cinema